Jean Charles Joseph Chaumet (21 February 1866, Prignac-et-Marcamps – 7 January 1932, Paris) was a French politician and republican militant. He is notable as one of the founders of radicalism.

References
"Charles Chaumet", in Dictionnaire des parlementaires français (1889-1940), Jean Jolly (ed.), PUF, 1960

External links
List of French ministers for Industry

1866 births
1932 deaths
French Ministers of Commerce and Industry
French Naval Ministers
Senators of Gironde